Chamaeleoninae is the nominotypical subfamily of chameleons (family Chamaeleonidae). The Family Chamaeleonidae was divided into two subfamilies, Brookesiinae and Chamaeleoninae, by Klaver and Böhme in 1986. Since its erection in 1986, however, the validity of this subfamily designation has been the subject of much debate, although most phylogenetic studies support the notion that the pygmy chameleons of the subfamily Brookesiinae are not a monophyletic group. While some authorities have previously preferred to use the subfamilial classification on the basis of the absence of evidence principal, these authorities later abandoned this subfamilial division, no longer recognizing any subfamilies with the family Chamaeleonidae. In 2015, however, Glaw reworked the subfamilial division by placing only the genera Brookesia and Palleon within the Brookesiinae subfamily, with all other genera being placed in Chamaeleoninae.

Classification
The ten previously recognised genera in the subfamily are:

Genus Archaius
Genus Bradypodion
Genus Calumma
Genus Chamaeleo
Genus Furcifer
Genus Kinyongia
Genus Nadzikambia
Genus Rieppeleon
Genus Rhampholeon
Genus Trioceros

Trioceros was previously considered to be a subgenus of Chamaeleo, until  &  (2009) raised it to full genus. Since then, two new species have been described in the genus Trioceros, by  &  (2010), and  et al. (2011). These two new species have not been published in combination with the generic name Chamaeleo, which poses a problem for the citation of these names in Wikipedia, unless Trioceros is treated as a full genus, following  &  (2009).

Footnotes

References
 ,  2010. A new chameleon of the Trioceros bitaeniatus complex from Mt. Hanang, Tanzania, East Africa (Squamata: Chamaeleonidae). Bonn zoological Bulletin 57 (1): 19–29.  PDF
  et al. 2011. A new species of chameleon (Sauria: Chamaeleonidae) from the highlands of northwest Kenya. Zootaxa, 3002: 1–16. Preview
 ,  2009. A re-appraisal of the systematics of the African genus Chamaeleo (Reptilia: Chamaeleonidae). Zootaxa, 2079: 57–68. Abstract & excerpt

External links
 

 Chamaeleoninae
Reptile subfamilies
Taxa named by Wolfgang Böhme (herpetologist)